Madhorajpura, is an ILRC and village in Phagi Tahsil in Jaipur district, Rajasthan. It has a population of around 5000.
Madhorajpura has eight patwar circles - Gopalpura, Chandma Kalan, Didawata, Dosara, Beechi, Bhankarota, Madhorajpura and Sehdariya

Based on 2011 census, Madhorajpura has 734 households with total population of 4,690 (51.81% males, 48.19% females). Total area of village is 19.49 km2. There are 5 primary schools and one post office in the village.

Villages in Madhorajpura panchayat samiti

References

Villages in Jaipur district